Jharoda Kalan is a village in South West  district, Delhi, India. The Police Training College of the Department of Police, Delhi is located in Jharoda Kalan. The CRPF camp is located here.
Jaroda kalan have mostly population of Jat community. This village have a good Startup ecosystem There are servel startup in this village one of the most successful startup is MY PROVIDERS.

References

Villages in South West Delhi district